Spratt-Allen-Aull House is a historic home located at Lexington, Lafayette County, Missouri.  It was built about 1840, and is a two-story, Greek Revival style red brick dwelling. It features a colossal pedimented tetrastyle portico with a full-facade upper deck.  Also on the property is the contributing octagonal, two-story frame ice house.

It was listed on the National Register of Historic Places in 1993.

References

Houses on the National Register of Historic Places in Missouri
Greek Revival houses in Missouri
Houses completed in 1840
Houses in Lafayette County, Missouri
National Register of Historic Places in Lafayette County, Missouri